Evelyn McCrystal (born 28 July 1978) is an Irish Paralympic cyclist competing in tandem events for Ireland, as a sighted pilot for blind cyclist Katie-George Dunlevy.

Career
McCrystal won a gold medal at the time trial B and a silver in the road race at the 2016 Summer Paralympics together with Katie-George Dunlevy. McCrystal, along with Dunlevy, won Gold in the  road race at the 2019 Yorkshire Para-Cyclist International event with a time of 02:36:57. In 2021 the pair won a silver medal at the delayed 2020 Summer Paralympics in the individual pursuit event.

McCrystal has also taken two titles at the Irish National Cycling Championships – the road race in 2018 and the time trial in 2020.

Personal life
McCrystal is a member of the Garda Síochána – the national police force in the Republic of Ireland – based in Ballybay, County Monaghan. She also does Ironman Triathlons in her spare time. She has two daughters.

References

External links

1978 births
Living people
People from Dundalk
Cyclists at the 2016 Summer Paralympics
Medalists at the 2016 Summer Paralympics
Paralympic gold medalists for Ireland
Paralympic silver medalists for Ireland
Paralympic cyclists of Ireland
Irish female cyclists
Paralympic medalists in cycling
Cyclists at the 2020 Summer Paralympics